Laroque-des-Albères is a commune in the Pyrénées-Orientales department in southern France.

It is part of the Occitanie region. The town is in the foothills of the Pyrénées mountains.

Geography

Localisation 
Laroque-des-Albères is located in the canton of Vallespir-Albères and in the arrondissement of Céret.

Government and politics

Mayors

Population

Sites of interest 
The castle (12th century), one of the finest examples of incastellamento in the area.
Puig Neulós

See also
Communes of the Pyrénées-Orientales department

References

Communes of Pyrénées-Orientales